Puri Jagannadh Touring Talkies  is an Indian film production company established by Tollywood director Puri Jagannadh. The company is based in Hyderabad.

Film production

References

Film production companies based in Hyderabad, India
2013 establishments in Andhra Pradesh
Indian companies established in 2013